Lena Åkesson (born August 10, 1967 in Stockholm, Sweden) is a former world-class female professional boxer whose career took place in the late 1990s.
Trained by Luis Lagerman and Angelo Dundee, Åkesson racked up a pro record of 14-1 with 8 KOs, her only loss coming in a 10-round decision to Melissa Del Valle for the WIBF title, in a bout that resulted in a unanimous decision in Del Valle's favor.

Professional boxing record

See also
 List of female boxers

References

External links
 Lena Åkesson at Awakening Fighters

Swedish women boxers
1967 births
Living people
Lightweight boxers